Abu ol Verdi (also Romanized as Abū ol Verdī and Abū ol Vardī; also known as Abīverdī and Abowlvardī) is a village in Abu ol Verdi Rural District, Hakhamanish District, Pasargad County, Fars Province, Iran. At the 2006 census, its population was 2,221, in 509 families.

References 

Populated places in Pasargad County